Fjord1 ASA is a Norwegian transport conglomerate, one of the largest in the Norwegian transport sector. Formed in 2001,  company headquarters are in Florø, with the headquarters of the ferry division in Molde. It operates a fleet of environmentally friendly vessels in the Norwegian fjords.

Formation
Nordvestlandske was formed in 2001 by the merger of the county council-owned ferry companies Møre og Romsdal Fylkesbåtar and Fylkesbaatane i Sogn og Fjordane, becoming Fjord1 in December 2002. The fact that the merged company headquarters were located in Sogn og Fjordane made the merger unpopular in Møre og Romsdal county. The choice of name, Fjord1, was also not well-accepted among the local population. These strains on public relations, amongst other things, resulted in talks intended to further the merger process breaking down during the winter and spring of 2004.

Fjord1 ASA was listed on the main list on the Oslo Stock Exchange on 15 August 2017. In 2021, US investment firm Vision Ridge Partners and Havila Holding,  an investment company owned by the Sævik family, privatised the company, with each having 50% ownership.

Operations
The company is one of the largest in the Norwegian transport sector. A holding company with numerous subsidiaries, its main assets are the two ferry companies MRF and Fylkesbaatane, which serve the rugged and numerous fjords of Møre og Romsdal and Vestland counties. The company is involved in numerous transport ventures within its two home counties, including a 66% ownership of the bus company Aukra Auto, a 49% ownership of fast ferry company Kystekspressen (operates an express boat route from Kristiansund to Trondheim) and a 49% of Fjord1 Partner, that operates the Bergen Light Rail. It owned four local bus companies, including Fjord1 Buss Møre, Fjord1 Sogn Billag, Hallingdal Billag and Fjord1 Nordfjord-Ottadalen.

In 2005, the company had 75 ships, 394 buses and 147 trucks and transported 24 million passengers. A study by Siemens and the Bellona Foundation in 2016 identified that of Norway's 180 ferries on 112 ferry routes, 127 could feasibly be replaced with either fully electric or hybrid ferries. Between 2017 and 2021, Fjord1 put into service 26 new hybrid-battery ferries and converted a further eight vessels to hybrid-battery propulsion, so they had 34 hybrid battery vessels operating on 17 routes, approximately 43 per cent of its ferries. The 2019 Annual Report records 19.9 Million passengers and 9.9 million vehilcles carried.

The group also operates in the tourism sector, through Fjord Tours Group (50/50 ownership with Vy-Gruppen) and The Fjords (50/50 ownership with Aurland Ressursutvikling).

References

 
Shipping companies of Norway
Companies based in Sogn og Fjordane
Transport companies established in 2001
2001 establishments in Norway
Transport companies of Vestland
Transport in Møre og Romsdal
Kinn
Møre og Romsdal County Municipality
Sogn og Fjordane County Municipality
Companies listed on the Oslo Stock Exchange